Michael Harry (born 23 May 1961 in Hvidovre) is a Danish curler and curling coach.

At the national level, he is a seven-time Danish men's champion curler (1979, 1982, 1987, 1988, 1993, 1994, 1995).

He participated in the curling demonstration event at the 1988 Winter Olympics, where the Danish men's team finished sixth.

Teams

Record as a coach of national teams

References

External links 

Living people
1961 births
Danish male curlers
Danish curling champions
Curlers at the 1988 Winter Olympics
Olympic curlers of Denmark
Danish curling coaches
People from Hvidovre Municipality
Sportspeople from the Capital Region of Denmark
20th-century Danish people